Larak (or Larag, Sumerian:, LA-RA-AKKI) was a city in Sumer (modern Iraq) that appears in some versions of the Sumerian King List as the third of five cities to exercise kingship in the antediluvian era. The only king of Larak to be mentioned in the SKL is En-sipad-zid-ana. The city is also mentioned in the Lament for Ur. The city has not yet been identified archaeologically, but a location to the east of Kish and near Isin has been suggested. Its patron deity was Pabilsag, a Ninurta-like warrior god additionally associated with judgment, medicine and the underworld, usually portrayed as the husband of Ninisina. A Larak is mentioned in writings of Neo-Babylonian and Neo-Assyrian times but it is not certain if this is the same city.

References

See also
Cities of the Ancient Near East

Sumerian cities
Archaeological sites in Iraq
Former populated places in Iraq
Former kingdoms